"Shangri-La Again" is the eighth episode of series 6 of The Goon Show, broadcast on 8 November 1955. Written by Spike Milligan it is based loosely on the novel Lost Horizon by James Hilton.

Plot
The story is set during the invasion of Manchuria (1933). Ned Seagoon leads the British residents of Peking in a desperate attempt to escape the clutches of the invading Japanese army. A pilot by the name of Count Moriarty offers to fly the residents to freedom for a considerable fee, however, even his plans are wrecked when his plane crashes in the mountains.

Seagoon, Moriarty and the other survivors must rely on a mysterious, barefoot boy named Bluebottle to guide them to safety. Bluebottle leads them to a beautiful city named 'Shangri-La', hidden from the rest of the world and (supposedly) free from all its vices. As Bluebottle puts it: "No drink, no sex, no sin. And I'm fed up with it, I am!"

Nevertheless, Seagoon finds the utter beauty of Shangri-La compelling and must decide whether he should accept Henry Crun's invitation to stay on as the new Dalai Lama or return to his former life in the world outside.

References

External links
 Transcript of Shangri-La Again GOON SHOW: TLO 90136, 6TH SERIES: No 8, BROADCAST: 8 Nov 1955, Script by: Spike Milligan)

The Goon Show episodes